Agyathuri is a town in Kamrup district, situated on the north bank of the Brahmaputra River near city of Guwahati.

Places of interest
 Ganesh Temple of Agyathuri
Saraighat war memorial

Transport
Agyathuri is at Guwahati Hajo road. All major modes of transportation are available in Agyathuri, including a railway junction.

See also
 Hajo
 Rangiya

References

Cities and towns in Kamrup district